Teddy Boy agapi mou (Greek: , Teddy Boy My Love) is a 1965 Greek comedy film directed by Alekos Sakellarios.

Plot

Zoi Laskari (as Zoi Eftychidou) and Kostas Voutsas (stars of the movie) which were characters that fell in love, even though they encountered their relatives in which they were widows that had a bond.

Cast

Zoe Laskari .... Zoi Eftychidou
Kostas Voutsas .... Aris Matsakoulis
Nitsa Marouda .... Popi
Nikitas Platis .... Asimakis Matsakoulis
Athinodoros Prousalis .... Kyriakos
Nana Skiada .... Mary Eftyhidou
Nikos Papanastassiou .... Kostas Panagiotidis
Kostas Papachristos .... constructor
Aliki Zografou .... Marika
Eleni Mavromati .... Rena Panagiotidou

External links

1965 films
1965 comedy films
1960s Greek-language films
Greek comedy films
Films directed by Giannis Dalianidis